Ambagarh Chowki has been merged with Mohla Manpur and has been made a district on 2021.in the state of Chhattisgarh, India

Geography
Ambagarh Chowki is located at the banks of Shivnath River (or Sheonath river). The town consist of many hillocks, on some of which temples were built. The commercial vegetation here consist of Mahua trees (Scientific name: Madhuca longifolia), and Tendu trees (Scientific name : Diospyros melanoxylon whose leaves are picked by the people licensed by the government tenders, which is later used to make beedi.

Demographics
 India census, Ambagarh Chowki had a population of 9889. Males constitute 49% of the population and females 51%. In Ambagarh Chowki, Female Sex Ratio is 1039 against the state average of 991. Ambagarh Chowki has an average literacy rate of 87.2%, higher than the state average of 70.28%; with 93.16% of the males and 83.8% of females literate. 11.71% of the population is under 6 years of age.

References

Cities and towns in Rajnandgaon district